Jayne Christine Svenungsson (1973) is a Swedish theologian and philosopher who holds the chair in Systematic Theology at Lund University. Her field of research lies within political theology, aesthetics and the philosophy of history.

In September 2017, Svenungsson was elected as a member of the Swedish Academy. She was installed on 20 December 2017, succeeding Torgny Lindgren on seat 9. She left the Academy on 7 November 2018.

Prizes and elected memberships 
 Per Beskow Prize for contributing to the dialogue between theology, society and culture in the public sphere, 2014.
 The Nine Society's Christmas Prize, 2014.
 Karin Gierow Prize (awarded by the Swedish Academy) for contributions to the dissemination of bildung, 2015.
 Vetenskapssocieteten i Lund (The New Society of Letters at Lund), since 2017.
 Kungliga Humanistiska Vetenskapssamfundet i Lund (The Royal Society of Letters at Lund), since 2018.
 Det Norske Videnskaps-Akademi (The Norwegian Academy of Science and Letters), since 2022.

Selected works

As author
 Guds återkomst: En studie av gudsbegreppet inom postmodern filosofi, 2004, 
 Den gudomliga historien: Profetism, messianism och andens utveckling, 2014, . Translated into English as Divining History: Prophetism, Messianism and the Development of the Spirit, 2016,

As editor or co-editor
 Postmodern teologi: En introduktion, 2006, 
 Systematisk teologi: En introduktion, 2007, 
 Jewish Thought, Utopia and Revolution, 2014, 
 Monument and Memory, 2015, 
 Heidegger’s Black Notebooks and the Future of Theology, 2017, 
 The Ethos of History: Time and Responsibility, 2018, 
 Vänskap/Friendship: Festschrift för Arne Rasmusson, 2021,

References

1973 births
Swedish theologians
Members of the Swedish Academy
Living people